Bogue Flower is a stream in the U.S. state of Mississippi. It is a tributary to Eucutta Creek.

Bogue Flower is a name derived from the Choctaw language meaning "long creek" (the element "flower" in this context is a corruption of an Indian word). Variant names are "Bogue Flowers Creek" and "Little Flower Creek".

References

Rivers of Mississippi
Rivers of Clarke County, Mississippi
Rivers of Wayne County, Mississippi
Mississippi placenames of Native American origin